Nicolau–Balus syndrome is a cutaneous condition characterized by syringomas and milia.

See also 
 Parry–Romberg syndrome
 List of cutaneous conditions
 List of cutaneous neoplasms associated with systemic syndromes

References 

Connective tissue diseases
Syndromes